At the 1960 Summer Olympics in Rome, four diving events were contested.

Medal summary
The events are labelled as 3 metre springboard and 10 metre platform by the International Olympic Committee, and appeared on the 1960 Official Report as 3-metre springboard diving and 10-metre high diving, respectively.

Men

Women

Medal table

Participating nations

See also
 Diving at the 1959 Pan American Games

Notes

References
 
 

 
1960 Summer Olympics events
1960
1960 in water sports